Rear admiral Sir John Berry (14 February 1689 or 1690) was an English officer of the Royal Navy.

Origins and early years
John Berry was born at Knowstone, in the English county of Devon. He was the second of seven sons of Daniel Berry, the vicar of Knowstone cum Molland by his wife Elizabeth Moore, daughter of Sir John Moore of Moor Hayes, Devon. Daniel Berry held the benefice, which he had inherited from his own father, but had been deprived of his position during the English Civil War. 

The Berry family was established during the reign of Edward I of England. The family name was derived from their manor of Nerbert or Narbor (modern Berrynarbor) near the Devon coast.

The Civil War saw the family's finances ruined, as Daniel Berry had been committed to the Royalist cause. After his father's death in 1652, John Berry and his elder brother joined the merchant service.

Naval career

Commands
 Swallow (7 October.1665 to 6 February 1665/66)
 Guinea (16 August to 1 November 1666) 
 Coronation (1667)
 Pearl (11 November 1668 to 12 January 1670) 
 Nonsuch (13 January 1670 to 10 July 1671)
 Dover (1 September 1671 to 8 April 1672)
 Resolution;(11 April 1672 to 3 April 1674) First Battle of Schooneveld (28 May 1673)
 Swallow (9 March 1674/5 to 28 April 1675)
 Bristol (28 April 1675 to 7 January 1677/78)
 Dreadnought (7 January 1677/78 to 21 August 1679) 
 Leopard (28 January 1679/80 to 20 April 1681)
 Gloucester (8.April 1682 to 6.May 1682)
 Henrietta (15 June 1682 to 18 April 1684)
 Elizabeth (1688 to 1689) Battle of Bantry Bay (1 May 1689)

Early career
By 1663 Berry had joined the Royal Navy as the boatswain of the ketch HMS Swallow, which was operating in the West Indies. When the captain of Swallow was promoted in 1665, Berry succeeded him, gaining his first command on 17 Sept. 1665. Upon his return to England in 1666. George Monck, the Duke of Albemarle gave him commissions for the Little Mary in February, and HMS Guinea on 16 August, a command he retained until 1 November. In the summer of 1666 he had overall responsibility for the smaller vessels attending the fleet.

Nevis (1667)
The Dutch and the French were threatening English possessions in the West Indies, and the island of Nevis seemed next to fall. In April 1667, Berry, in the Coronation, a 56-gun hired man-of-war, arrived at Barbados from England. Merchant ships were bought and adapted for service, and 10 vessels and a fireship were made ready. Berry was given overall command of the squadron by the governor of Barbados, Lord Willoughby. The French and Dutch possibly collected 20 men-of-war and other vessels at Saint Kitts.  

Berry blockaded the allied fleet as they were preparing to themselves attack the English, and on 20 May 1667 the French and the Dutch were defeated in an engagement that lasted for many hours. He successfully forced them to retreat, the French departing for Martinique, and the Dutch for Virginia. The English victory at the Battle of Nevis enabled the Royal Navy to regain Antigua and Montserrat.

Newfoundland
In 1675, Berry was captain of the annual Newfoundland convoy. The permanent settlers there had been ordered to remove themselves to other colonies in America or be forcibly removed to England. As captain of the annual convoy, Berry was the representative of royal authority in the island and it was his duty to inform the settlers of this decision. Berry reported that the colonists were being unjustly treated. His attempts to present their case in a favourable light and his views ultimately resulted in the settlers becoming permanently established on the island, and British policy being reversed.

Virginia (1677)
Berry took HMS Bristol to the Mediterranean in 1675–1676, taking her to Virginia in January 1677 to deal with Bacon's Rebellion. The rebels had already been dealt with, and Berry instead became involved in the aftermath of the rebellion, dealing with disputes that had arisen between the leaders in Virginia.

Tangier

By 1680 Charles II had threatened to give up Tangier, which costly for parliament to maintain and difficult to defend, as in order to protect the town and harbour from attack, the perimeter had to be increased. A number of outworks were built, but a siege in 1680 showed that they could be successfully overcome. In 1683, Charles gave Admiral Lord Dartmouth secret orders to abandon Tangier. Dartmouth was to level the fortifications, destroy the harbour, and evacuate the troops. That August, Dartmouth sailed from Plymouth. The forts and walls were mined, and on 5 February 1684, Tangier was evacuated, leaving the town in ruins.

In 1683, after Berry was appointed to command the HMS Henrietta, a 50-gun third rate  frigate, he became the vice-admiral of the fleet sent to the Mediterranean to evacuate the garrison and destroy the harbour and defensive works.

Sinking of HMS Gloucester (1682)
In April 1682, HMS Gloucester was due to be deployed, along with five other ships, to Tangier via Ireland, when Berry was appointed to command the ship, and was assigned to transport the Duke of York (the future King James II of England) and his party from Sheerness to Leith. James intended to settle his affairs as Lord High Commissioner to the Parliament of Scotland, and collect his pregnant wife Mary of Modena (along with his daughter Anne from his previous marriage), before returning from Edinburgh to London and taking up residence at his brother Charles’s court.

Gloucester, together with the Ruby, Happy Return, Lark, Dartmouth and Pearl, and the royal yachts Mary, Katherine, Charlotte and Kitchen, convened on 3 May. The fleet left the Kent coast the following day, watched by Charles and members of the royal court. Bad weather forced the Gloucester to moor up during the first night. As a signal for the fleet to drop anchor, she fired a gun, but three ships, misinterpreting the signal, sailed out to sea, and never re-joined the fleet. On the second evening, a dispute arose between James, several officers, and the ship's pilot, about the correct course to take. James settled the matter when he decided upon a middle course. Less than an hour later, she sank.

Partly through Berry's efforts and determination to stay with his ship until the end, the ship's boats were lowered down, enabling the Duke of York and some of his courtiers and advisors to reach the safety of the other ships. Boats managed to rescue more people, and many were saved, but between 130 to 250 sailors and passengers lost their lives.<ref name="Roy" / Berry wrote a detailed account of the disaster soon afterwards.

Other posts
Berry was from 1684 on service as a Navy commissioner. He was governor of Deal Castle from June 1674, and became a commissioner for Virginia in 1677.

Glorious Revolution
In 1688, after the defection of Lord Dartmouth, Berry commanded the fleet deployed against William of Orange when he moved against the Stuart king, James II.

Marriage
Berry married Rebecca Ventris of Granhams, Great Shelford, Cambridgeshire, as identified from the arms of Ventris shown on her monument in a church in Stepney. She may have been a sister of Sir Peyton Ventris, the eldest surviving son of the barrister Edward Ventris. The marriage was without progeny.

Final years

Berry was placed in command at Sheerness Dockyard over the winter of 1688–1689, but ill health had forced him to retire by 1689.

Berry died at Portsmouth on 14 February 1690, and was buried at St Dunstan's, Stepney. He commissioned his own mural monument for the church, at a cost of  £150. The inscription, in Latin, is translated as:
 
"Lest thou should not know, O reader, the famed Sir John Berry of Devon, with dignity of a knight, not just ruler of the sea (as well know too the Barbaries) having gained from King and Country well-deserved great glory on account of matters happily conducted, satiated with the glory of fame, after many victories brought home, as with others, was not able to defeat the Fates. He died 14 February 1689, was baptised 7 January 1635"''

The monument survives, but no longer the pristine white of Prince's description but covered with a yellowish-brown patina. No trace survives of the arms described by Prince. His will, dated 2 February 1688, mentions his wife Rebecca, who married 10 months after Berry's death.

References

Sources

Further reading

External links

 Sir John Berry (1635-1690/91) from the Three Decks website

1635 births
1690 deaths
Military personnel from Devon
Royal Navy admirals
People of British North America
Captains of Deal Castle
Year of death unknown
17th-century Royal Navy personnel
People from North Devon (district)